Charles Mott may refer to:

 Charles Stewart Mott (1875–1973), American businessman, philanthropist and mayor of Flint, Michigan
 Charles James Mott (1880–1918), English baritone singer
 Charles Francis Mott (1877–1967), English physicist and educator
 Charles T. Mott, architect in the United States